This is a list of Israel's ambassadors to Haiti.  The current ambassador is Daniel Biran Bayor, who has held his position since 2018.

List of Ambassadors

Daniel Biran Bayor (Non-Resident, Santo Domingo) 2018 - 
Yaacov Deckel 1982 - 1986
Zvi Loker 1975 - 1980 
Zeev Bashan 1973 - 1975
Mordekhai Shneeron (Non-Resident, Mexico City) 1960 - 1963

References

Haiti
Israel